American Muscle Car is a weekly television show on Speed, produced by Restoration Productions LLC., about muscle cars. Original release was in 2003.  Each episode provides a timeline of each vehicle's history beginning with its first year of production to its most recent year of production. The show was initially designed to showcase traditional muscle cars such as the Chevrolet Camaro, Ford Mustang, and Dodge Charger. It eventually added other performance vehicles such as the Shelby Cobra and the, and even began to focus on specific eras such as the (disambiguation)|.
In 2006 season, the show's focus was expanded to include designers and engineers of muscle car era.

In 2007 season, the show's focus was expanded to include vintage races, powertrain components.

Controversies
In the episode "Bad boys: The Fastest Musclecar Engines", the show claimed that the vintage engines used were built to factory specs and tunings. This resulted in 1967 426 Hemi engine producing 820 hp and 689 lb-ft torque. However, Engine Systems Inc., the company that performed the dynamometer tests, reported that the motors were built as they would have been done in specialty dealers like Yenko, Mr. Norms, and so on. The parts used to build the replica engines came from specialty engine builders, and contained parts that did not meet factory specifications engines.

Note
In The Episode S02E01 - Pontiac Firebird Trans Am, The full name of Trans Am is given as "Trans American Sedan Racing Series". This is incorrect. The actual name of Trans Am is the "Trans American Sedan Championship".

Episodes
Season 1
 S01E01 - 1964 Pontiac GTO
 S01E02 - 1969 Pontiac GTO Judge
 S01E03 - 1953-62 Chevrolet Corvette
 S01E04 - 1967-69 Chevrolet Camaro SS 396
 S01E05 - 1964 Ford Fairlane Thunderbolt
 S01E06 - Ford Mustang Shelby GT-350
 S01E07 - Buick Gran Sport
 S01E08 - 1969-71 Hurst Oldsmobile 442
 S01E09 - Chevrolet Chevelle SS 396 & SS 454
 S01E10 - 1961-64 Chevrolet Impala 409
 S01E11 - Plymouth Hemi Cuda & Dodge Hemi Challenger
 S01E12 - 1968 Chevrolet Nova SS 396

Season 2
 S02E01 - Pontiac Firebird Trans Am
 S02E02 - 1959-1963 Pontiac 421 Super Duty
 S02E03 - Ford Fairlane GT
 S02E04 - 427 Cobra
 S02E05 - 1963-1967 Chevrolet Corvette
 S02E06 - Camaro Z/28
 S02E07 - Dodge Charger Daytona and Plymouth Superbird
 S02E08 - The Mopar Super Stockers
 S02E09 - American Motors AMX and Plymouth AAR 'Cuda
 S02E10 - Dodge Challenger T/A
 S02E11 - Buick Regal
 S02E12 - 1955-1957 Chevrolet Bel Air

Season 3
 S03E01 - Ford Thunderbird
 S03E02 - Ford Ranchero and Chevrolet El Camino
 S03E03 - The COPO cars
 S03E04 - 1968-2001 Corvette
 S03E05 - Chrysler 300
 S03E06 - The Dodge Ramchargers
 S03E07 - Dodge Charger
 S03E08 - Dodge Viper
 S03E09 - Boss 302 and 429 Mustangs
 S03E10 - The Saleen Mustangs
 S03E11 - The Hurst Cars
 S03E12 - The SLP Cars
 S03E13 - Dodge Dart GTS
 S03E14 - Plymouth Road Runner

References

External links
Restoration Productions LLC home page

Automotive television series
2003 American television series debuts
2005 American television series endings
2000s American reality television series
Muscle cars